The 1983 Barcelona City Council election, also the 1983 Barcelona municipal election, was held on Sunday, 8 May 1983, to elect the 2nd City Council of the municipality of Barcelona. All 43 seats in the City Council were up for election. The election was held simultaneously with regional elections in thirteen autonomous communities and local elections all throughout Spain.

Electoral system
The City Council of Barcelona was the top-tier administrative and governing body of the municipality of Barcelona, composed of the mayor, the government council and the elected plenary assembly.

Voting for the local assembly was on the basis of universal suffrage, which comprised all nationals over 18 years of age, registered in the municipality of Barcelona and in full enjoyment of their civil and political rights. Local councillors were elected using the D'Hondt method and a closed list proportional representation, with an electoral threshold of five percent of valid votes—which included blank ballots—being applied in each local council. Councillors were allocated to municipal councils based on the following scale:

The mayor was indirectly elected by the plenary assembly. A legal clause required that mayoral candidates earned the vote of an absolute majority of councillors, or else the candidate of the most-voted party in the assembly was to be automatically appointed to the post. In the event of a tie, the eldest one would be elected.

The electoral law allowed for parties and federations registered in the interior ministry, coalitions and groupings of electors to present lists of candidates. Parties and federations intending to form a coalition ahead of an election were required to inform the relevant Electoral Commission within fifteen days of the election call, whereas groupings of electors needed to secure the signature of at least one-thousandth of the electorate in the constituencies for which they sought election—with a compulsory minimum of 500 signatures—disallowing electors from signing for more than one list of candidates.

Opinion polls
The tables below list opinion polling results in reverse chronological order, showing the most recent first and using the dates when the survey fieldwork was done, as opposed to the date of publication. Where the fieldwork dates are unknown, the date of publication is given instead. The highest percentage figure in each polling survey is displayed with its background shaded in the leading party's colour. If a tie ensues, this is applied to the figures with the highest percentages. The "Lead" column on the right shows the percentage-point difference between the parties with the highest percentages in a poll.

Voting intention estimates
The table below lists weighted voting intention estimates. Refusals are generally excluded from the party vote percentages, while question wording and the treatment of "don't know" responses and those not intending to vote may vary between polling organisations. When available, seat projections determined by the polling organisations are also displayed below (or in place of) the voting estimates in a smaller font; 22 seats were required for an absolute majority in the City Council of Barcelona.

Voting preferences
The table below lists raw, unweighted voting preferences.

Results

Notes

References
Opinion poll sources

Other

Barcelona
1983
1980s in Barcelona
1983 in Catalonia